The 2018 TCR Asia Series season is the fourth season of the TCR Asia Series. For the first time at the first three events of TCR Asia, the South-East Asia Cup will be held.

Teams and drivers

Calendar and results
The provisional 2018 schedule was announced on 17 January 2018, with five events scheduled.

Championship standings

Drivers' championship

Teams' championship

Notes

References

External links
 

TCR Asia Series
Asia Series